Forty Naughty Girls is a 1937 American comedy film directed by Edward F. Cline and written by John Grey. The film stars James Gleason, ZaSu Pitts, Marjorie Lord, George Shelley and Joan Woodbury. It is the sixth and final entry in RKO Pictures' series of Hildegarde Withers films. This film was the sixth film in the Hildegarde Withers-Oscar Piper series, and the second film in which ZaSu Pitts appeared as Hildegarde. Before Pitts, Edna May Oliver and Helen Broderick had played the role.

Plot
The plot follows Inspector Oscar Piper and Hildegarde Withers as they attend a Broadway show, and get involved in a case where a press agent gets shot and an actor gets murdered live on stage.

Cast
 James Gleason as Inspector Oscar Piper
 ZaSu Pitts as Hildegarde Withers
 Marjorie Lord as June Preston
 George Shelley as Bert
 Joan Woodbury as Rita Marlowe
 Frank M. Thomas as Jeff Plummer
 Tom Kennedy as Detective Casey
 Alan Edwards as Ricky Rickman
 Stephen Chase as Tommy Washburn 
 Eddie Marr as Windy Bennett 
 Ada Leonard as Lil
 Barbara Pepper as Alice

Production notes
The role of Hildegarde Withers along with James Gleason as Inspector Oscar Piper was played by;
The Penguin Pool Murder (1932), starring Edna May Oliver
Murder on the Blackboard (1934), starring Edna May Oliver
Murder on a Honeymoon (1935), starring Edna May Oliver (based on The Puzzle of the Pepper Tree, 1934)
Murder on a Bridle Path (1936), starring Helen Broderick
The Plot Thickens (1936), starring ZaSu Pitts
Forty Naughty Girls (1937), starring ZaSu Pitts

References

External links
 
 
 
 

1937 films
1930s comedy mystery films
American comedy mystery films
American black-and-white films
Films directed by Edward F. Cline
Films set in New York City
RKO Pictures films
Hildegarde Withers
1937 comedy films
1930s English-language films
1930s American films